The Grotto Beach Formation is a geologic formation in the Bahamas. It preserves fossils dating back to the Middle to Late Pleistocene period.

See also 
 List of fossiliferous stratigraphic units in the Bahamas

References

Further reading 
 L. Gardiner. 2001. Stability of Late Pleistocene Reef Mollusks from San Salvador Island, Bahamas. Palaios 16:372-386
 B. J. Greenstein, L. A. Harris, and H. A. Curran. 1998. Comparison of recent coral life and death assemblages to Pleistocene reef communities: implications for rapid faunal replacement on recent reefs. Carbonates and Evaporites 13(1):23-31

Geologic formations of the Caribbean
Geology of the Bahamas
Neogene Caribbean
Limestone formations
Reef deposits